This is a list of characters associated with the Marvel Comics superhero Black Widow (Natalia Romanova).

Allies

Enemies

Notes
  – Denotes a love interest

References

External links
 Night Raven at the Appendix to the Handbook of the Marvel Universe
 Black Lotus at the Appendix to the Handbook of the Marvel Universe
 Kono Sanada at the Appendix to the Handbook of the Marvel Universe
 Rose at the Appendix to the Handbook of the Marvel Universe
 Vindiktor at the Appendix to the Handbook of the Marvel Universe
 Watchlord at the Appendix to the Handbook of the Marvel Universe
 Wrangler at the Appendix to the Handbook of the Marvel Universe

Black Widow (Marvel Comics)
Black Widow characters, List of